Sweet and Innocent may refer to:

 "Sweet and Innocent" (Donny Osmond song)
 "Sweet and Innocent" (Diamond Head song)
 Sweet and Innocent (album), a compilation album by Diamond Head